Florin Nicolae Arteni-Fîntînariu (born 6 March 2001) is a Romanian rower. He competed in the men's eight event at the 2020 Summer Olympics.

References

External links
 

2001 births
Living people
Romanian male rowers
Olympic rowers of Romania
Rowers at the 2020 Summer Olympics
Rowers at the 2018 Summer Youth Olympics
Sportspeople from Suceava